In statistics, functional additive models (FAM) can be viewed as extensions of generalized functional linear models where the linearity assumption between the response (scalar or functional) and the functional linear predictor is replaced by an additivity assumption.

Overview

Functional Additive Model
In these models, functional predictors are paired with responses that can be either scalar or functional. The response can follow a continuous or discrete distribution and this distribution may be in the exponential family. In the latter case, there would be a canonical link that connects predictors and responses. Functional predictors (or responses) can be viewed as random trajectories generated by a square-integrable stochastic process. Using functional principal component analysis and the Karhunen-Loève expansion, these processes can be equivalently expressed as a countable sequence of their functional principal component scores (FPCs) and eigenfunctions. In the FAM the responses (scalar or functional) conditional on the predictor functions are modeled as function of the functional principal component scores of the predictor function in an additive structure. This model can be categorized as a Frequency Additive Model since it is additive in the predictor FPC scores.

Continuously Additive Model
The Continuously Additive Model (CAM) assumes additivity in the time domain. The functional predictors are assumed to be smooth across the time domain since the times contained in an interval domain are an uncountable set, an unrestricted time-additive model is not feasible. This motivates to approximate sums of additive functions by integrals so that the traditional vector additive model be replaced by a smooth additive surface. CAM can handle generalized responses paired with multiple functional predictors.

Functional Generalized Additive Model
The Functional Generalized Additive Model (FGAM) is an extension of generalized additive model with a scalar response and a functional predictor. This model can also deal with multiple functional predictors.
The CAM and the FGAM are essentially equivalent apart from implementation details and therefore can be covered under one description. They can be categorized as Time-Additive Models.

Functional Additive Model

Model

Functional Additive Model for scalar and functional responses respectively, are given by
 
 

To ensure identifiability one may require,

Implementation

The above model is considered under the assumption that the true FPC scores  for predictor processes are known. 
In general, estimation in the generalized additive model requires backfitting algorithm or smooth backfitting to account for the dependencies between predictors. Now FPCs are always uncorrelated and if the predictor processes are assumed to be gaussian then the FPCs are independent. Then 
  
similarly for functional responses 
  
This simplifies the estimation and requires only one-dimensional smoothing of responses against individual predictor scores and will yield consistent estimates of 

The fitted Functional Additive Model for scalar response is given by
  and the fitted Functional Additive Model for functional responses is by
 
Note: The truncation points  and  need to be chosen data-adaptively. Possible methods include pseudo-AIC, fraction of variance explained or minimization of prediction error or cross-validation.

Extensions

For the case of multiple functional predictors with a scalar response, the Functional Additive Model can be extended by fitting a functional regression which is additive in the FPCs of each of the predictor processes . The model considered here is Additive Functional Score Model (AFSM) given by
 
In case of multiple predictors the FPCs of different predictors are in general correlated and a smooth backfitting technique has been developed to obtain consistent estimates of the component functions  when the predictors are observed with errors having unknown distribution.

Continuously Additive Model

Model
Since the number of time points on an interval domain is uncountable, an unrestricted time-additive model  is not feasible. Thus a sequence of time-additive models is considered on an increasingly dense finite time grid  in  leading to
In the limit  this becomes the continuously additive model

Special Cases

Generalized Functional Linear Model
For  the model reduces to generalized functional linear model

Functional Transformation Model
For non-Gaussian predictor process,  where  is a smooth transformation of  reduces CAM to a Functional Transformation model.

Extensions
This model has also been introduced with a different notation under the name Functional Generalized Additive Model (FGAM). Adding a link function  to the mean-response and applying a probability transformation  to  yields the FGAM given by 
  
where  is the intercept.
Note: For estimation and implementation see

References

Generalized linear models